Insidious: Fear the Dark is an upcoming American supernatural horror film directed by Patrick Wilson in his directorial debut, with a screenplay by Scott Teems from a story by series creator Leigh Whannell. The film is a direct sequel to Insidious (2010) and Insidious: Chapter 2 (2013), and serves as both the fifth installment in the Insidious franchise and the fifth installment in terms of chronology. Wilson, Rose Byrne, Ty Simpkins and Andrew Astor reprise their roles from the films.

After the release of Insidious: The Last Key in 2018, Blumhouse Productions opted for possibilities to produce future films in the franchise, including a crossover with the Sinister series. In October 2020, the studio announced that Wilson would direct and star in the new film, with Teems writing the script based on a story written by Whannell.

Insidious: Fear the Dark is scheduled to be theatrically released on July 7, 2023, by Sony Pictures Releasing.

Synopsis

Cast 
 Patrick Wilson as Josh Lambert
 Rose Byrne as Renai Lambert
 Ty Simpkins as Dalton Lambert
 Andrew Astor as Foster Lambert 
Additionally, Peter Dager, Jarquez McClendon, Sinclair Daniel, and Hiam Abbass appear in the film in undisclosed roles.

Production

Development 
Following the release and box office success of Insidious: The Last Key, a sequel entered development. Producer Jason Blum expressed interest in a crossover with Sinister. On October 29, 2020, it was announced that a direct sequel to Insidious and Insidious: Chapter 2 was in development with Patrick Wilson serving as director in his directorial debut from a screenplay written by Scott Teems based on a story by Leigh Whannell. Wilson and Ty Simpkins will reprise their roles from the first two films.

Filming 
In February 2022, Wilson confirmed that location scouting had begun with filming set to begin in Spring that year. Principal photography commenced in August 2022, with Peter Dager, Jarquez McClendon, Sinclair Daniel, and Hiam Abbass joining the cast, as well as Rose Byrne confirmed to be returning. On August 22, 2022, Wilson revealed that filming has wrapped.

Release
The film is scheduled to be released in the United States on July 7, 2023, by Sony Pictures Releasing.

References

External links 
 

2020s horror thriller films
American horror thriller films
American sequel films
American serial killer films
British horror thriller films
British sequel films
British serial killer films
Canadian horror thriller films
Canadian sequel films
Canadian serial killer films
Blumhouse Productions films
2023 directorial debut films
2020s English-language films
Films produced by Jason Blum
Films with screenplays by Scott Teems
English-language Canadian films
Insidious (film series)
Upcoming films
Upcoming sequel films
Upcoming directorial debut films
2020s American films
2020s Canadian films
2020s British films
2023 horror films
2023 films